Jo Planckaert (born 16 December 1970 in Deinze) is a former Belgian professional road bicycle racer. He is the son of former professional road bicycle racer Willy Planckaert, brother of famous road bicycle racers Eddy and Walter Planckaert.

Major victories 

1993
 1st, Stage 3, Vuelta a Andalucía
 1st, Stage 4, Vuelta a Murcia
 1st, Ronde van Midden-Zeeland
1995
 1st, Nokere Koerse
 1st, Grand Prix de Denain
 1st, Stage 4b, Tour of Sweden
 2nd, Clásica de Almería
1997
 2nd, Paris–Roubaix
 2nd, Le Samyn
1998
 1st, GP Briek Schotte
 1st, Grote Prijs Jef Scherens
 Étoile de Bessèges
 1st, Overall and Stage 3
1999
 1st, Kuurne–Brussels–Kuurne
 1st, Stage 2, Étoile de Bessèges
2000
 1st, Tro-Bro Léon
 1st, Étoile de Bessèges
 1st, Stage 5, Vuelta a Andalucía
 1st, Stage 1, Tour de Wallonie
 1st, Stage 1, Tour du Limousin
2001
 1st, Grand Prix Zottegem
2003
 1st, Stage 2, Étoile de Bessèges
2004
 2nd, Grand Prix d'Ouverture La Marseillaise

See also
 List of doping cases in cycling
 Francesco Planckaert
 Eddy Planckaert
 Willy Planckaert
 Walter Planckaert

External links

Belgian male cyclists
1970 births
Living people
Doping cases in cycling
People from Deinze
Cyclists from East Flanders